Evander Holyfield vs. Riddick Bowe was a professional boxing match that took place on November 13, 1992 in Las Vegas, Nevada. The fight was contested for the undisputed world heavyweight championship, which consisted of the WBA, WBC, and IBF championships.

Background
On October 25, 1990, world #1 contender Holyfield fought Buster Douglas in the first defense of the title Douglas won eight months earlier by upsetting Mike Tyson in Tokyo. Holyfield defeated an out-of-shape Douglas by knocking him out in the third round, and had made three defenses of his three titles entering this fight. The first was, against George Foreman, the former champion who was attempting a comeback and to become the oldest heavyweight champion ever. After winning a unanimous decision Holyfield signed to fight Tyson on November 8, 1991, but Tyson pulled out with an injury. Instead, Holyfield took on journeyman Bert Cooper and suffered his first career knockdown, nearly falling to defeat before rallying to knock out the lightly regarded contender in a fight, the WBC refused to sanction as a title fight. The Tyson fight was then scuttled altogether; after Tyson was convicted of rape and incarcerated in early 1992.

With Holyfield in need of an opponent, undefeated Riddick Bowe emerged as the frontrunner to land the next shot at Holyfield's undisputed championship. Holyfield's manager Shelly Finkel and Bowe's manager Rock Newman, were nearly able to get a deal done shortly after Tyson's conviction, but it fell apart after the two sides could not agree on financial issues. Eventually, Bowe landed a number-one contender ship match with Pierre Coetzer, which he won by seventh round technical knockout, earning the right to challenge Holyfield for his undisputed heavyweight championship.

Meanwhile, Holyfield took a tune up fight in June 1992, against another aging former champion in Larry Holmes. Although the 43-year-old Holmes had won six consecutive fights after recording what were his only career losses to that point (his 1985 title-losing fight and 1986 rematch with Michael Spinks and his 1988 comeback fight against Tyson) and went the distance with the champion, Holyfield emerged with another unanimous decision win. Afterwards, he faced criticism for taking the title from an uninterested Douglas and then defending it against two past-their-prime fighters in Foreman and Holmes and nearly getting knocked out by the journeyman Cooper. As a result, some in the boxing world looked at Holyfield's match with Bowe as a way for the champion to legitimize his championship reign and earn the respect of his doubters despite his two-year reign as champion.

The fight
In what would become one of the greatest heavyweight boxing matches of all time, Bowe defeated Holyfield by unanimous decision, winning all three judge's scorecards by scores of 117–110, 117–110 and 115–112. Though he had been a 7–5 favorite, Holyfield had difficulty trading punches with the bigger, stronger and younger Bowe, Bowe landed 53% of his 248 thrown punches while Holyfield only managed to land 39% of his 161 thrown. The fight is perhaps best known for its round 10. In round 10, Bowe came out strong, hitting Holyfield with several powerful combinations. Holyfield; however, was able to weather the storm and dominated the second half of the round, landing several combinations of his own. Bowe would dominate round 11; however, hitting an exhausted Holyfield with even more combinations eventually hitting Holyfield with a right hook before knocking Holyfield down with a right hand to the side of the head. Though announcer Jim Lampley claimed it would "seem like a miracle" for Holyfield to finish the round, Holyfield somehow managed to survive the remainder of the round. Knowing he was behind in the scorecards and would need a knockout to win the fight, Holyfield was aggressive in round 12. Bowe was able to withstand Holyfield's offense throughout the round, and was named the new heavyweight champion via unanimous decision thereafter.

Aftermath
The match was critically acclaimed, winning The Ring magazine's Fight of the Year with round 10 of the fight also winning the magazine's Round of the Year. Only a month later, Bowe would vacate his WBC Heavyweight Championship after refusing to fight number one contender Lennox Lewis after the two sides couldn't agree on a split for the fight's $32 million purse; and as a result, this marked the last time that the Undisputed Heavyweight Championship was contested for 6 years & 4 months until Lewis and Holyfield met in 1999. He would keep his WBA and IBF Heavyweight titles, however, and would successfully defend them in easy victories against Michael Dokes and Jesse Ferguson. After much anticipation, Bowe and Holyfield would meet in a rematch on November 6, 1993 for Bowe's Heavyweight championship. The duo again went 12 rounds with Holyfield earning the victory via majority decision.

Broadcasting

References

|-

1992 in boxing
Boxing in Las Vegas
1992 in sports in Nevada
Holyfield 1
Bowe 1
World Boxing Association heavyweight championship matches
World Boxing Council heavyweight championship matches
International Boxing Federation heavyweight championship matches
Boxing on HBO
November 1992 sports events in the United States